Rick Mather (May 30, 1937 – April 20, 2013) was an American-born architect working in England. Born in Portland, Oregon and awarded a B.arch. at the University of Oregon in 1961, he came to London in 1963 and worked at the architectural firm Lyons Israel Ellis for two years. He became a leading figure  at the Architectural Association in the 1970s, and in 1973 founded his own practice, Rick Mather Architects.

Rick Mather Architects
Mather set up his own practice, Rick Mather Architects, in 1973. The partners at Rick Mather Architects Gavin Miller and Stuart Cade have since launched a new practice MICA, which will complete the remaining RMA projects, whilst simultaneously working on its own strategic masterplans, buildings and landscapes.

Style
Mather was widely respected for his sensitive and carefully considered approach, and his innovation in low energy design. Rick’s vision and insight, with its clear logic, and elegant articulation, is reflected in many award winning buildings, both in the UK and abroad. Characteristics of his buildings include extensive use of structural glass and natural lighting of interior spaces, respect for existing buildings, and sustainability.

Work
Mather oversaw many significant buildings, including the Ashmolean Museum, Keble College, Dulwich Picture Gallery, together with the masterplan for London’s Southbank Centre. His built projects include:
 School of Education and Information Systems (1980, now housing School of Education and Norwich Business School), Climatic Research Unit (1988; RIBA Award) and development plan for the campus, University of East Anglia.
 The Times headquarters, London Docklands (1991).
 Series of restaurants for the Zen chain in London, Hong Kong and Montreal (1985-1991).
 Technology Tower, London Metropolitan University (2000).
 Masterplan for Southbank Centre, London (2000 to date).
 Arco Building (1995; RIBA Award, Civic Trust Award, British Construction Award), Sloane-Robinson building (2002; RIBA Award, Civic Trust Award, Brick Award, Oxford Preservation Trust Award) and H B Allen Centre building (former Acland Hospital site, 2016–18) at Keble College, Oxford.
 Master plan, Gower Building (1997) and Jubilee Sports Centre (2004) for Highfield Campus of University of Southampton.
 Klein House, Hampstead (1998; RIBA Award and runner-up for Stirling Prize).

 Extension and refurbishment of Dulwich Picture Gallery, London (1999; RIBA Award, Civic Trust Award, AIA Award).
 ISMA Centre for the University of Reading (1999; RIBA Award, Civic Trust Award)

 Wallace Collection Centenary Project, London (2000).
 New galleries and refurbishment for National Maritime Museum, Greenwich (1995-9; Civic Trust Award) and Masterplan for Maritime Greenwich World Heritage Site landscape (1998–2003).
 School of Architecture, University of Lincoln, Brayford campus (2003; RIBA Award, Shortlisted for the Prime Ministers Award for Better Public Buildings).
 Lyric Theatre Hammersmith (2004).
 Towner Gallery, Eastbourne (2005-9; RIBA Award, British Design Award, Sussex Heritage Trust Award)

 Art and Design Academy, Liverpool John Moores University (2008; RIBA Award).
 Ashmolean Museum Masterplan and Expansion Ashmolean, Oxford (2009; RIBA Award, Shortlisted for the Stirling Prize 2010, Building - Project of the Year Award).
 Stowe School Masterplan (2001-2020) and Girls' Boarding Houses (2008; RIBA Award).
 Barking Town Centre London Road Masterplan
 Central Milton Keynes Residential Quarter
 Corpus Christi College Auditorium, Oxford, Oxford (2009; RIBA Award).
 Sunken library extension, The Queen's College, Oxford (2006–17).
 East Range, Mansfield College, Oxford (2014).
 Campus wide masterplan and expansion of the Virginia Museum of Fine Arts, Richmond, Virginia USA (2010). (RIBA Winner 2011).
 James Allen's Community Music Centre (RIBA Competition Winner 2008).
 North Harlow Masterplan (2010-).
 Barking Skills Centre (2009-).
 South Kilburn residential development, Brent, London (2009-)
 Chester Balmore residential development, Camden, London (2010-)

Further reading

References

1937 births
2013 deaths
20th-century American architects
Architects from Portland, Oregon
University of Oregon alumni
People associated with the Ashmolean Museum
American emigrants to the United Kingdom